Gustaf Lindvall (born January 8, 1991) is a Swedish professional ice hockey goaltender who is currently playing with Skellefteå AIK in the Swedish Hockey League (SHL). He previously played with Timrå IK in the Elitserien during the 2010–11 Elitserien season.

References

External links

1991 births
AIK IF players
IF Sundsvall Hockey players
Living people
People from Boden Municipality
Skellefteå AIK players
Swedish ice hockey goaltenders
Timrå IK players
Tingsryds AIF players
VIK Västerås HK players
Sportspeople from Norrbotten County